Lilima Minz (born 10 April 1994) is an Indian female field hockey player. Lilima hails from Bihabandh-Tanatoli village, Lanjiberna Block, Sundargarh District of Odisha. She is a product of Sports Hostel, Panposh, Rourkela, Odisha.

Career
Lilima Minz, born on 10 April 1994, trained at the Sports Hostel, Panposh, Rourkela, Odisha. Lilima represented Indian senior team for the first time in 2011 during a four-nation tournament in Argentina. She was part of Indian women hockey's team that won the bronze medal in junior's hockey world cup for the first time in 2013. In March 2018, Minz completed her 100 appearances for the National team. Minz was also part of the squad that represented India in 2016 summer Olympics after 36 years. She was also part of Asian cup winning squad in 2017. Lilima was one of the four players who were made to sit on the floor of the train for an hour due to unconfirmed railway ticket on their way back to home from Rio Olympics.

Awards and Achievements
Lilima has appeared for Indian National team in more than 100 matches.

 Received a special incentive of Rs 10 Lakh for participation in Rio Olympic Games by Odisha Mining Corporation.
 Was awarded Rs. 75,000 by Odisha government and Rs. 10,000 by Odisha Cricket Association in October 2014 for helping India win women's bronze medal in the 17th Asian Games at Incheon.
 Was felicitated by Mahanadi Coalfields Limited felicitated with a cash award of Rs 1 lakh for helping India win bronze medal in the 2013 Junior Women Hockey World Cup in Germany.

International
 Part of the Indian team that won the bronze medal in the Girls U-18 Asia Cup Hockey Championship at Bangkok, Thailand (25 September 2011).
 Represented Indian senior women's hockey team in the FIH World League (Round 2) at New Delhi from 18 to 24 February 2013.
 She was a part of the Indian team that won the bronze medal for the first time in Women's Junior Hockey World Cup at Monchengladbach in Germany on 4 July 2013.
 Member of the Indian team that won the women's hockey test series 6–0 against Malaysia held at Kualalumpur from 9 to 17 June 2014.
 She was part of the Indian women team in 20th Commonwealth Games, held in Glasgow from 23 July to 3 August 2014.
 She was a member of the Indian women hockey team that won the bronze medal in the 17th Asian Games at Incheon ( South Korea ) on 1 October 2014.
 Played her 50th match for the Indian women hockey team against the China in the Hawke's Bay Cup at Hastings in New Zealand on 11 April 2015.
 Completed her 100 appearances for India against Korea in March 2018.
Represented India in the Rio Olympics, Brazil, 2016.
She was part of the 2017 Asian cup winning squad.
Represented India in 2018 Commonwealth Games.
Represented India in the 2018 Women's Hockey World Cup in London.

National
 Represented Panposh Hostel in the Junior Nehru Cup Hockey Tournament in 2006, 2007, 2008, 2009 (Champions) and 2010 (3rd position).
 Represented Orissa in the National Rural Games in 2007 and 2009 (Champion).
 Represented Orissa in the National School Games in 2006, 2008, 2009 (Champion) and 2011.
 Represented Orissa in the National Inter-School Games in 2008 (3rd position).
 Represented Orissa in the Sub-junior National Championship in 2007 (3rd position) and 2008 (3rd position).
 Represented Orissa in the Women's National Games in 2010 (Runners-up).
 Represented Orissa in the Senior National Championship in 2011 (3rd position).
 Represented Orissa in the National Games in 2011.

References

External links

Lilima Minz at Hockey India

1994 births
Living people
Indian female field hockey players
21st-century Indian women
21st-century Indian people
Asian Games medalists in field hockey
Asian Games silver medalists for India
Asian Games bronze medalists for India
Female field hockey defenders
Field hockey players at the 2014 Asian Games
Field hockey players at the 2016 Summer Olympics
Field hockey players at the 2018 Asian Games
Field hockey players from Odisha
Medalists at the 2014 Asian Games
Medalists at the 2018 Asian Games
Olympic field hockey players of India
Sportswomen from Odisha
Field hockey players at the 2014 Commonwealth Games
Commonwealth Games competitors for India